Serradell is a hamlet located in the municipality of Conca de Dalt, in Province of Lleida province, Catalonia, Spain. As of 2020, it has a population of 35.

Geography 
Serradell is located 114km north-northeast of Lleida.

References

Populated places in the Province of Lleida